Unser Wien (Our Vienna) is a book co-authored by Stephan Templ and Tina Walzer that details how hundreds of Jewish businesses in Vienna were seized by the Nazis and never given back.

Background
Published in 2001, the book catalogued for the first time the hundreds of prominent Jewish-owned properties seized by the Nazis that were never returned, and details the names of famous beneficiaries.

The first section of the book, written by Walzer, describes the various methods of looting employed by the Nazis and the fate of the Jewish victims, with references to specific cases and examples which provides historical and political context for the second section of the book.

The New York Times notes that what distinguishes the book is not the history, which was broadly known, but rather the details in the second half of the book, called The Topography of Robbery which lists businesses, addresses and former and current owners.

The second half of the book, compiled by co-author Templ, acts as a guided tour of the extent of Jewish property confiscations in Vienna under Nazism and the stories attached to them. The book details properties seized by Jewish owners such as Samuel Schallinger who co-owned the Imperial and the Bristol hotels, which today are still among the city of Vienna's grandest hotels.

Controversy
The book exposed long-held secrets about the Nazi era in Austria, and helped initiate numerous restitution legal claims. 
Co-author Templ  himself became involved in a restitution case in 2005 which evolved in to a decade of legal entanglement.

In 2015, Templ received a one-year sentence as punishment for having omitted the name of an estranged aunt in an application on behalf of his mother for the return of property seized from his Jewish relatives in 1938. It has since emerged that he had declared the existence of the aunt. The BBC News notes that critics have suggested that the jailing may be linked to the author's criticism of the government's restitution record.

See also
 The Holocaust in Austria
 Aryanization

References

External links
Excerpts from Unser Wien – Our Vienna
User Wien map

Austrian books
Books about the Holocaust